On 15 August 1976, SAETA Flight 232 en route from Quito, Ecuador, to Cuenca was reported missing while in flight. The SAETA-operated Vickers Viscount 785D carried 55 passengers and 4 crew members. The snow-capped mountain Chimborazo, which is 150 kilometers from the capital and stands 6,319 meters above sea level, is thought to be a dangerous part of the route.

Searches of the possible crash area produced no results. A mid-route crash on the stratovolcano Chimborazo was considered to be most probable, though some speculated a guerrilla hijacking.

The pilot's last contact with the control tower reported that he was flying over the city of Ambato, but the station soon after lost all communication with the plane. As a result of the impact, the vessel was hidden amidst the snowy glacier of Chimborazo. The place of impact was declared a graveyard, and the remains were not recovered. The ship's remains were lost for 26 years, which led to a lot of speculation about why the plane and its people went missing, as well as some controversy when they were found again.

The plane was eventually found at 5,310 meters (17,420 feet) in October 2002 by two members of the Nuevos Horizontes mountaineering club, Pablo Chiquiza and Flavio Armas, while exploring a new route to the summit of Chimborazo via the García Moreno Glacier. However, they did not report it immediately. The discovery wasn't confirmed until February 2003, when a team hired by the television network Teleamazonas went up the volcano to record a video of the wreckage and found human remains, newspapers from the day the plane disappeared, and identification cards of known passengers.

Discovery 
After intense, unsuccessful searches for the remains of the aircraft both in air and on land in the area of the route towards Cuenca and other places like the Ozogoche area, south of the Chimborazo province, in the Ecuadorian coast and the Ecuadorian East, neither the plane nor its occupants could be found. Relatives of the victims sought supernatural explanations and asked for the help of psychics; some even hinted at the theory of alien abduction. The search was terminated without finding a single trace. 26 years after the accident, on February 14, 2003, widespread news of the plane’s discovery by mountaineer Miguel Cazar who was interviewed by Teleamazonas TeVe (now Teleamazonas) revealed that they had seen both metal and human remains in the García Moreno glacier of the Chimborazo volcano. The mountaineers Pablo Chíquiza and Flavio Armas, accompanied by soldiers from “la Brigada de Fuerzas Especiales N°9 Patria” (Ecuador’s Special Forces Brigade), arrived at the volcano to mark the exact site where they found the remains of the plane. These mountaineers were the ones who, in October of 2002, during their climb on the northeast side of the mountain, found the remains of the crashed plane.

In October of 2002 when mountaineers Pablo Chíquiza and Flavio Armas ascended a nearly unexplored face of the snowy mountain. The first day, they arrived at the base of the mountain where they stayed overnight. The second day, they began their ascent up the mountain, running into the remains of the plane at 5,550 meters. Impressed by such a finding, they took samples of the cans and newspapers that, in spite of the past 26 years, were still legible. They continued up the mountain, but after climbing several additional meters, they decided to turn around to stay overnight with the remains. On the third day, they descended down the mountain.

In the nearby moor, they met a farmer of the area who they asked about the plane crash. He replied by stating that “the military soldiers already climbed up the mountain some years ago and did not find survivors”. Such a response made them think that the plane had already been found, and they continued on their way. Weeks passed and in the face of doubts from friends and family about whether the plane had actually been discovered or not, they decided to start an investigation of their own accord. After reading the newspapers of the time and confirming with a document obtained by Galo Arrieta in “la Dirección de Aviación Civil” (Ecuador’s Civil Aviation Directorate), they concluded that the plane still had not been found. Galo Arrieta, in military passive service, established contact with Pablo Chíquiza during the two days of discovery and promised to help them with the investigation as well as the subsequent broadcast of the discovery, as long as the first to hear of the news was Lucio Gutiérrez, the president at the time. Therefore, on December 23 of the same year, Chíquiza and Armas ventured back up Chimborazo, this time specifically looking for evidence such as personal artifacts or aircraft identifiers that could verify the presumed identity of the flight. At the discretion of the climbers, the search for human remains was laborious. Nevertheless, in spite of the snow that covered the area of the accident, they succeeded in finding the identification document of one of the passengers. With said document, they believed their search was sufficient and descended down the mountain.

After turning in the document as well as other evidence of the plane to Arrieta, the wait for the news release was longer than they expected. According to the climbers, Arrieta “dragged his feet on the matter” until finally, after pressuring the colonel and not obtaining an interview with Lucio Gutiérrez as they had been promised, they acquired an interview with the minister of Defense, Nelson Herrera, who immediately ordered to send a military group to the place of discovery and to spread the news.

Due to the delayed release of news regarding the discovery, a series of investigations began under the authority of "el Congreso Nacional" (Ecuador's National Congress), the police, and the government. According to Bernardo Abad, journalist for Teleamazonas, they asked for thousands of dollars for the video Rodrigo Donoso delivered to the channel and its subsequent broadcast. According to some photographers, he also wanted to sell them photos for 100 dollars.

On their side, Chíquiza and Armas presented another video in Canal Uno hours before Teleamazonas to refute that Donoso and his team were the head of the discovery. Both Chíquiza and Armas as well as Donoso and his team presented to testify in Congress, giving their versions in the district attorney's office as well. On his side of the case, Arrieta admitted that he knew of the discovery, but, according to him, “had to make sure the president (Lucio Gutiérrez) was the first to find out and for this reason, could not share the news with other people”.

The families, in spite of the pain of all these facts, relaxed because after 26 years, they finally knew with near certainty what happened to the plane and where their loved ones lay. By suggestion of the military and the climbers Chíquiza and Armas, the area where they found the remains was declared a holy field due to the difficulty of recovering all the bodies.

References

External links
Description at Aviation Safety Network
Hallaron en Ecuador un avión de pasajeros que se estrelló hace 26 años
Se confirma que hallazgo de avión fue el año pasado
367 muertos en accidentes aéreos
Junta Investigadora de Accidentes confirmó hallazgo de restos de avión perdido en 1976
Cronología de Accidentes
After a month, plane still missing
Plane crash's frozen victims found 27 years later

See Also 
Accidente de aviación
Anexo:Accidentes más graves de aviación (1943-presente)
Anexo:Accidentes e incidentes notables en la aviación civil

Aviation accidents and incidents in 1976
Aviation accidents and incidents in Ecuador
Accidents and incidents involving the Vickers Viscount
232
1976 in Ecuador 
1976 disasters in Ecuador 

August 1976 events in North America